The DCM Trophy was a three match One Day International cricket series which took place between 16 and 19 September 1999.  The tournament was held in Canada, and involved Pakistan and the West Indies.  The tournament was won by Pakistan, who won the series 3–0. It followed the DCM Cup played at the same venue between India and the West Indies the previous week.

Teams

Squads

Fixtures

ODI series

1st ODI

2nd ODI

3rd ODI

Statistics

References

External links
1999 DCM Trophy at CricketArchive

1999 in Canadian cricket
International cricket competitions from 1997–98 to 2000
International cricket tours of Canada